Mendivil may refer to:

People
 Soraya Jiménez Mendívil (born 1977), a Mexican weightlifter and Olympic champion
 Ulises Mendivil (born 1980), a Mexican footballer

Places
 Mendívil, Álava, Basque Country, Spain

See also
 Coronel FAP Alfredo Mendívil Duarte Airport, serves Ayacucho, Peru